Bonobo is a 2018 Swiss short film directed by Swiss director Zoel Aeschbacher as a graduation film for his directing studies at the ECAL. The film premiered at 2018 Clermont-Ferrand International Short Film Festival where it won the Audience Award. It has been selected and awarded at several film festivals including Palm Springs International Film Festival and the Brooklyn Film Festival where it won the Best Short Film Spirit Award. In September 2019 the film received the Oscar Qualifying Gold Medal for "Best Narrative" (International) at the Student Academy Awards.

Plot 
When the elevator of their public housing breaks down, the fates of Felix, a disabled pensioner, Ana, a single mother struggling with her move and Seydou, a young man passionate about dance intertwine towards an explosive ending where their limits will be tested.

Awards 
Since its launch, the film has received numerous awards around the world.

References

External links 
 

2018 short films
2018 films
Swiss short films